Noer Hassan Wirajuda (born July 9, 1948 in Tangerang, West Java, Indonesia) is an Indonesian politician who was the foreign minister of Indonesia from 2001 to 2009. He served during the presidencies of Megawati Sukarnoputri and Susilo Bambang Yudhoyono.

Education 

Wirajuda earned a Doctor of Juridical Science in international law from the University of Virginia School of Law (1981), a Master of Law (LL.M) from Harvard University School of Law (1985), and a Master of Arts in Law and Diplomacy (MALD) from the Fletcher School of Law and Diplomacy at Tufts University (1984).

In 1971, he graduated from the Faculty of Law of the University of Indonesia and in 1976, he spent a year at Oxford University in the United Kingdom earning a Certificate in Diplomacy.

Diplomatic career
A lawyer by training and a diplomat by choice, Wirajuda has held several important posts including Director-General of Political Affairs of the Ministry of Foreign Affairs (July 2000 - August 2001), Ambassador and Permanent Representative to the United Nations and other international organizations in Geneva (December 1998 - July 2000), Ambassador Extraordinary and Plenipotentiary to Egypt (October 1997 - December 1998), and Director of International Organizations of the Department of Foreign Affairs (1993–1997).

On February 6, 2009, Wirajuda criticized Myanmar for their abuse of Rohingya people, after nearly 400 Rohingya refugees were rescued off the coast of Sumatra in the first month of 2009.

In 2007 he chaired the first Indonesia-UK forum alongside British foreign minister Margaret Beckett.

Wirajuda was the proponent of the ASEAN Political and Security Community (of the three pillars of ASEAN Community) with core values in the promotion of democracy, respect for human rights, good governance and the establishment of an ASEAN Human Rights body which would later become the ASEAN Intergovernmental Commission on Human Rights (AICHR). He actively championed for a more inclusive and balanced East Asia, as reflected by the first East Asia Summit of 16 member states in 2005.

On October 22, 2009, Marty Natalegawa was appointed foreign minister.

During his diplomatic career, Wirajuda also assisted the establishment of the Indonesian National Commission on Human Rights (Komnas HAM).

Notes

External links

 Profile at TokohIndonesia 

1948 births
Living people
Indonesian Muslims
People from Tangerang
Sundanese people
Foreign ministers of Indonesia
Ambassadors of Indonesia to Egypt
University of Indonesia alumni
University of Virginia School of Law alumni
Harvard Law School alumni